Mimathyma is a genus of butterflies in the family Nymphalidae found in eastern and southern Asia. The genus was erected by Frederic Moore in 1896.

Species
Listed alphabetically:
 Mimathyma ambica (Kollar, [1844]) – Indian purple emperor
 Mimathyma chevana (Moore, [1865]) – sergeant emperor
 Mimathyma nycteis (Ménétriès, 1859) (Amurland, Korea, northeast China) 
 Mimathyma schrenckii (Ménétriès, 1858) – Schrenck's emperor (Amurland, Korea, northeast China)

References

External links

 
Apaturinae
Taxa named by Frederic Moore
Nymphalidae genera